Eparchy of Nossa Senhora do Paraíso em São Paulo  is an eparchy located in the city of São Paulo in the Ecclesiastical province of São Paulo in Brazil.

Territory and statistics

The eparchy includes all Melkite Catholic faithful of the Melkite Greek Catholic Church in Brazil. Its eparchial seat is the city of São Paulo, where is located the Nossa Senhora do Paraíso Cathedral.

The territory is divided into five parishes. In 2013 there were 436,000 Catholics.

History

On 14 November 1951 was erected the Ordinariate of Brazil to the Eastern Rite Catholics whom all Melkite Catholics belonged till November 29, 1971 when by Papal bull Haec Romana of Paul VI was established the Melkite Greek Catholic Eparchy of Nossa Senhora do Paraíso em São Paulo.

Leadership
 Bishops of Nossa Senhora do Paraíso em São Paulo (Greek-Melkite Rite) and Coadjutor
 Bishop Elias Coueter (November 29, 1971 – June 22, 1978)
 Bishop Spiridon Mattar (June 22, 1978 – April 20, 1990)
 Bishop Pierre Mouallem, S.M.S.P. (April 20, 1990 – July 29, 1998), appointed Archbishop of Akka [San Giovanni d’Acri; Tolemaide] (Melkite Greek), Israel
 Archbishop (personal title) Fares Maakaroun (December 18, 1999 – July 21, 2014)
 Bishop Joseph Gébara (October 31, 2013 – July 21, 2014), Coadjutor Bishop
 Bishop Joseph Gébara (later Archbishop) (July 21, 2014 – February 20, 2018), appointed Archbishop of Petra e Filadelfia (Melkite Greek), Jordan
 Bishop Sérgio de Deus Borges (May 23, 2018 – June 17, 2019), Apostolic Administrator
 Bishop George Khoury (since June 17, 2019)

References

External links
 http://www.pgc-lb.org/fre/melkite_greek_catholic_church/Eparchy-of-Sao-Paulo-Brazil
 GCatholic.org
 Catholic Hierarchy

Eastern Catholic dioceses in Brazil
Christian organizations established in 1971
Nossa Senhora do Paraiso em Sao Paulo, Melkite Greek Catholic Eparchy of
Melkite Greek Catholic eparchies
Roman Catholic dioceses and prelatures established in the 20th century
Melkite Greek Catholic Church in Brazil